Clayton Lima Szabo (born 24 November 1982), commonly known as Keké, is a Brazilian futsal player who plays as a pivot for Assoeva and the Brazilian national futsal team.

References

External links
Liga Nacional de Futsal profile

1982 births
Living people
Brazilian men's futsal players
ADC Intelli players